Battle of Kismayo may refer to:

 Fall of Kismayo (2007), an offensive by the Somali National Army and Ethiopian forces against Islamic Courts Union (ICU) fighters
 Battle of Kismayo (2008), an offensive begun by Islamist al-Shabaab and ICU fighters
 Battle of Kismayo (2009), an offensive begun by Sheikh Ahmed "Madobe" and his Ras Kamboni Brigade forces
 Battle of Kismayo (2012), an offensive led by Somali National Army forces and AMISOM allies